Homayoun Behzadi (20 June 1942 – 22 January 2016) was an Iranian footballer and coach. He usually played as a striker.

Early life
He was born on 4 January 1942 in Khorramabad, Lorestan Province. Behzadi first broke into the Shahin side when he was only 16 years old. He played for Shahin until 1966, when due to financial problems Shahin FC dissolved. He is graduated in Persian language.

Playing career

Club career
In 1967, he changed to Persepolis. In spring 1968, he changed to Peykan. There he won the Tehran Championship in 1968 before changing to Persepolis in 1969. There he won the Iranian league in 1972 as well as in  1974.

International career
In 1966 he won the silver medal of the Asian Games in Thailand. He won the Asian Nations Cup with Iran in 1968 – when he scored 4 goals in 4 matches, also the equalizer in the final match, which led to 2–1 victory against Israel (and to become one of the tournament's top scorer). He also won the Asian Nations Cup with Iran in 1972.

Coaching career
Before his starting his coaching career, he trained Persepolis in the absence of manager Alan Rogers, when he was part of the team. After he retired in 1975, he became caretaker head coach of the club after resignation of Rogers. He starts a project in Persepolis that held in next years to decrease the age of the first team squad. His first match as the Persepolis match was a friendly against Malavan which won 3–1. His first official match was a loss to Rah Ahan. After that, Persepolis won and drew twice, then faced to the rivals, Taj (now Esteghlal) in Tehran derby. He lost the match 3–1, but after the match he claimed that Taj players drugs before the match. It was later rejected. He was banned for two months and was replaced with Buyuk Vatankhah. After he was sacked as Persepolis head coach, he was manager of Shahbaz B team for more than ten years.

After retirement

Membership in Persepolis Hall of Fame
He was named as one of the members of Persepolis F.C. Hall of Fame and the club thanked him for his great performance during his senior career at Persepolis. The club gave him a statue of his face and named him as one of the twelve great players of Persepolis in the 1970s.

Illness and death
He suffered a heart attack and was transferred to Tehran hospital in April 2013. After two days, he was transferred to Day hospital and his personal doctor announced that his general health is good. He was released on 12 May 2013.

On 22 January 2016, Behzadi died in his home at the age of 74.

Honours

Club
Shahin
Tehran Football League
Winner (7): 1958–59, 1959–60, 1964–65, 1965–66
Runner-Up (6): 1961–62, 1962–63
Tehran Hazfi Cup
Winner (1): 1962–63

Paykan
Tehran Football League
Winner (1): 1969–70

Persepolis
Iranian Football League
Winners (2): 1971–72 1973–74
Runners-Up (1): 1974–75

International
AFC Asian Cup
Winner (2): 1968, 1972
Asian Games
Runner-Up (1): 1966

Individual
AFC Asian Cup Top goalscorer: 1968
Persepolis Hall of Fame: 2013
Asian Football Hall of Fame: 2014

References

External links
Homayoun Behzadi at TeamMelli.com
Interview with Homayoun Behzadi

1942 births
2016 deaths
Iranian footballers
Iranian football managers
Shahin FC players
Persepolis F.C. players
People from Khorramabad
Iran international footballers
1968 AFC Asian Cup players
AFC Asian Cup-winning players
Persepolis F.C. managers
Asian Games silver medalists for Iran
1972 AFC Asian Cup players
Asian Games medalists in football
Footballers at the 1966 Asian Games
Association football forwards
Medalists at the 1966 Asian Games